Irena Lasiecka (born February 4, 1948) is a Polish-American mathematician, a Distinguished University Professor of mathematics and chair of the mathematics department at the University of Memphis. She is also co-editor-in-chief of two academic journals, Applied Mathematics & Optimization and Evolution Equations & Control Theory.

Lasiecka earned her Ph.D. in 1975 from the University of Warsaw under the supervision of Andrzej Wierzbicki. In 2014, she became a fellow of the American Mathematical Society "for contributions to control theory of partial differential equations, mentorship, and service to professional societies."

Her specific areas of study are partial differential equations and related control theory, non-Linear PDEs, the optimization theory, calculus of variations, and boundary stabilization.

Early life and education 
Irena Lasiecka was born and raised in Poland, where she received her initial background in mathematics. She studied math for many years at the University of Warsaw, where she earned her Master of Science degree in applied mathematics in 1972. A few years later, she received her PhD from the same university in the same field of study.

Teaching 
After receiving her PhD, Lasiecka started to transfer her knowledge of Applied Mathematics to others in addition to more personal studying and research. Her first teaching job was at the Polish Academy of Sciences in 1975, and she later ventured to the United States a few years later, teaching at the University of California, Los Angeles. She has been teaching in the US ever since. The following is a chart listing the institutions in which Lasiecka has been a teaching faculty member of.

Areas of Study in Applied Mathematics

Optimization 
Optimization is the mathematical practice of finding the maximum or minimum values for a specific function. It has many real-world uses, and is a  common practice for people of many different professions.

The work of Lasiecka involves the optimization differential systems. These involve an optimization problems over functions, with a constraint that relates a function to its derivatives. She has written extensively about this topic in her collaborative work Optimization Methods in Partial Differential Equations.

Control theory 
Control Theory is one of Irena Lasiecka's chief areas of study. She begins her book, Mathematical Control Theory of Coupled PDEs, with a description of what Control Theory is. She states, " The classical viewpoint taken in the study of differential equations consisted of the (passive) analysis of the evolution properties displayed by a specific equation, or a class of equations, in response to given data. Control theory, however, injects an active mode of synthesis in the study of differential equations: it seeks to influence their dynamical evolution by selecting and synthesizing suitable data (input functions or control functions) from within a preassigned class, to achieve a predetermined desired outcome or performance."

In simpler terms, control theory is the ability to influence change in a system, something that changes over time. In order to better understand this concept, it is useful to know a few key phrases. A state is a representation of what the system is currently doing, dynamics is how the state changes, reference is what we want the system to do, an output is the measurements of the system, an input is a control signal, and feedback is the mapping from outputs to inputs. This can be applied to many facets of real-life, especially in various engineering fields that concentrate on the control of changes in their field. A good example of control theory applied to the real world is something as simple as a thermostat. The output in this system is temperature, and the control is turning the dial on or off, or to a higher or lower temperature.

Lasiecka uses this theory to further understand partial differential equations. She attempts to answer the questions of how to take advantage of a model in order to improve the system's performance. This idea is paired her desire to understand mathematical solutions of the problems of well-posedness and regularity, stabilization and stability, and optimal control for finite or infinite horizon problems and existence and uniqueness of associated Riccati equations. In Mathematical Control Theory of Coupled PDEs, Lasiecka studies this concept through waves and hyperbolic models. This book was written in order to "help engineers and professionals involved in materials science and aerospace engineering to solve fundamental theoretical control problems. Applied mathematicians and theoretical engineers with an interest in the mathematical quantitative analysis will find this text useful."

Awards and honors 
 SI Highly Cited Researcher
 University of Warsaw Award, 1975, for Ph.D. dissertation
 Polish Academy of Sciences Award, 1979, for overall scientific contributions
 Creativity Extension Award by the National Science Foundation, 1987
 Silver Core Award from International Federation for Information Processing (IFIP), 1989
 University Research Initiative Award from AFOSR, 1989-1992
 Barrett Lectures- Principal Lecturer, University of Tennessee, March 1997
 IEEE Distinguished Lecturer 1999-2002
 CMBS-NSF Conference, Principal Lecturer, Mathematical Control Theory of Coupled PDEs, University of Nebraska, August 4–9, 1999
 Distinguished Visiting Scholar, Texas Tech University, March 2000
 Principal Lectures: Autumn School on Evolution Equations, Trento, Italy, Nov. 2002
 IEEE Fellow with the citation: For Contribution to Boundary Control Systems, since 2004
 Appointed to International Advisory Board of the Polish Academy of Sciences, 2006
 The Technical Achievement Award with the citation: "for outstanding contribution to nonlinear mathematical analysis and control," June 22, 2006, Budapest, Hungary, by ICNPAA - International Congress on Nonlinear Analysis and Applications
 Appointed to the Nominating Committee for Nomination of Candidates for the 2008 (24th), 2009, 2010, 2011 Japan Prize in Science and Technology
 Awarded Honorary European Union Visiting Professorship at the University of Warsaw, Poland, Summer 2010
 Principal lecturer, Nonlinear Hyperbolic PDEs, Dispersive and Transport Equation (HCDTE), 7 lectures, SISSA, Trieste, May—June 2011
 Principal lecturer summer school, Linear and Nonlinear Evolutions, Istanbul, Koç University, July 2011, 4 lectures
 SIAM 2011 W. T. and Idalia Reid Prize for contribution to Differential Equations and Control Theory- this award earned Lasiecka $10,000, and it was for  fundamental contributions in control and optimization theory, specifically for work in dynamical systems governed by partial differential equations and their applications.
 Listed by StateStats.org in top 26 Women Professors in Virginia, May 9, 2013
 Commonwealth Professor of Mathematics, as of August 2011 (Endowed Chair), University of Virginia
 Recipient of the Presidential Professorship in Sciences, Warsaw, Presidential Palace, October 9, 2012
 Principal Lecturer Recent Advances in PDE's with Application, University of Milan, Milan, June 17–21, 2013
Ellis B. Stouffer Distinguished Lecture,   Department of Mathematics, University of Kansas . December 3, 2013.
SIAM Reid  Prize Lecture, Hyatt Regency, Baltimore, July 2011.
Plenary Speaker at HYP-RIO 2014, IMPA, Rio de Janeiro, July 26-August 1, 2014. 
Plenary Speaker at SIAM-SEAS, University of Alabama at Birmingham, Alabama, March 20–25, 2015. 
Awarded the Kosciuszko Foundation Distinguished Fellow of the Collegium of Eminent Scientists-2014
Induced to the 2015 Class  of AMS Fellows  for contribution to  control theory of PDE's, mentorship and service to professional societies. 
Plenary Speaker at IMACS Conference on Nonlinear Evolution Equations and Wave Phenomena, Georgia Center, University of Georgia, April 1–04, 2015. 
Plenary Speaker at the Oberwolfach Lectures  Seminar Mathematical Theory of Flow-Fluid Structure Interactions,  Oberwolfach, Germany,  November 21–26, 2016.
Plenary Lecture at the Conference "Paths in Mathematical Control Theory", Torino, Italy, February 27, 2018.
Awarded {\bf SIAM Fellow}  -2019 with the  citation {\it For fundamental contributions to control theory of partial differential equations and their dissemination through numerous invited talks, administrative positions in professional societies, and the mentoring of many PhD students and postdoctoral associates. }
 Plenary Speaker at ETAMM  2018 [Emerging Trends in Applied Mathematics and Mechanics], Cracow, June 18, 2018. 
 Awarded by the  AACC-IFAC  American Automatic Control Council  the 2019 Richard E. Bellman Control Heritage Award with the citation { for contribution to boundary control theory of distributed parameter systems }

Publications (books) 
 Differential and Algebraic Riccati Equations with Applications to Boundary/Point Control Problems: Continuous Theory and Approximation Theory (with R. Triggiani), Springer Verlag, Lecture Notes 164, 1991, 160p.
 Research monograph, Deterministic Control Theory for Infinite Dimensional Systems, vols. I and II (with R. Triggiani) Encyclopedia of Mathematics, Cambridge University Press, 1999.
 Research monograph, Stabilization and Controllability of Nonlinear Control Systems Governed by Partial Differential Equations (with R. Triggiani) in preparation under a contract from Kluwer Academic Publishers.
 NSF-CMBS Lecture Notes: Mathematical Control Theory of Coupled PDE's, SIAM, 2002.
 Functional Analytic Methods for Evolution Equations (co-authored with G. Da Prato, A. Lunardi, L. Weis, R. Schnaubelt), Springer Verlag Lecture Notes in Mathematics, 2004.
 Tangential Boundary Stabilization of Navier-Stokes Equations (with V. Barbu and R. Triggiani), Memoirs of AMS, vol. 181, 2005.
 Long-Time Behavior of Second-Order Equations with Nonlinear Damping (with I. Chueshov),  Memoirs of AMS, Vol. 195, 2008.
 Von Karman Evolutions (with I. Chueshov), Monograph Series, Springer Verlag, 2010.
 SISSA Lecture Notes: Well-Posedness and Long-Time Behavior of Second-Order Evolutions with Critical Exponents, AMS Publishing, to appear.
Irena has written and edited numerous research journals and articles in addition to the above books.

References 

Living people
Polish mathematicians
Polish women mathematicians
University of Warsaw alumni
University of Memphis faculty
20th-century American mathematicians
21st-century American mathematicians
Fellows of the American Mathematical Society
1948 births
20th-century women mathematicians
21st-century women mathematicians
Fellows of the Society for Industrial and Applied Mathematics